Sodepur High School is a school located at Sodepur Station Road, Sodepur, Kolkata, India. This is affiliated to the West Bengal Board of Secondary Education for Madhyamik Pariksha (10th Board exams), and to the West Bengal Council of Higher Secondary Education for Higher Secondary Examination (12th Board exams). The school was established in 1853 led by Ishwar Chandra Chattopadhyay and Kedarnath Bandopadhyay.

See also
Education in India
List of schools in India
Education in West Bengal

References

External links 
 

High schools and secondary schools in Kolkata
Educational institutions established in 1853
1853 establishments in India